Icmadophila ericetorum is a species of lichen belonging to the family Icmadophilaceae.

It has a cosmopolitan distribution.

References

Pertusariales
Taxa named by Carl Linnaeus